The Ariel Award for Best Picture (Ariel de Mejor Película in Spanish) is the highest award given in Mexico to a single film and is part of the Mexican Academy of Film's Ariel Award program.

Award results

1940s

1950s

1953 — Not awarded

1959 to 1971 — Awards suspended

1970s

1980s

1990s

2000s

2010s

2020s

Notes

External links
 

Mexican film awards
Awards for best film
Ariel Awards